"Hole Hearted" is a song by American rock group Extreme. The song was released as the fourth and final single and closing track from their successful Pornograffitti album in 1991 and reached  4 on the US Billboard Hot 100. It also charted at No. 12 on the UK Singles Chart and No. 2 in Canada. The song ends with the sound of a thunderstorm, which closes Pornograffiti, similar to how "Decadence Dance" (the lead single and opening track on Pornograffiti) begins with the same sounds and starts the album.

Although the song's chart position was lower compared to the band's previous hit, "More Than Words" (No. 1 in the US, No. 2 in the UK), it remains their second-highest charting song overall. Like "More Than Words", the style of this song is different from the majority of its parent album. The song's videoclip was shot outside the Boston Centre for the Arts at 551 Tremont Street in Boston (street number seen on many of the pans around the band). The song is excluded from some editions of the vinyl LP version of the album.

Content
Guitarist Nuno Bettencourt said the album Pornograffiti was nearly done when he finally received a 12-string guitar he had ordered. He opened the guitar case and spontaneously started playing the eventual opening chords to "Hole Hearted" on the guitar. He was so excited that he needed to use the bathroom, where he came up with most of the song on the toilet. He said, "That song was written fast, and I remember coming out of the bathroom, saying, 'I've got this really cool tune,' and everybody looked at me kind of weird. I was listening to Led Zeppelin III at the time a lot, and there was a lot of acoustic stuff on there. So I kind of took the groove a little bit, borrowed that feel from being inspired by the Zep III album."

Track listings
Single
 "Hole Hearted" – 3:39
 "More Than Words" (a cappella with congas) – 5:34
 "Suzi (Wants Her All Day What?)" – 3:38

EP
 "Hole Hearted" – 3:40
 "Get the Funk Out" (12-inch remix) – 7:00
 "Suzi (Wants Her All Day What?)" – 3:33
 "Sex N' Love" – 2:47

Charts

Weekly charts

Year-end charts

Release history

References

1990 songs
1991 singles
A&M Records singles
Black-and-white music videos
Extreme (band) songs
Songs written by Gary Cherone
Songs written by Nuno Bettencourt